The United Kingdom petroleum pipeline network is principally made up of three pipelines systems: the former Government Pipeline and Storage System (GPSS) now the CLH Pipeline System; the Esso pipelines (principally the mainline and midlines), and the United Kingdom Oil Pipelines (UKOP) and associated pipelines.  There are also several other lines including the Fina line built around 1990 that runs from North Lincolnshire to the Buncefield oil depot near Hemel Hempstead.

GPSS 
The GPSS was originally constructed between 1941 and 1944 and then extended after the war, most notably during the 1950s, 1970s and 1980s. The first commercial pipeline to be constructed in the United Kingdom was built in 1959 by Shell-Mex and BP from the GPSS depot at Walton on Thames to Heathrow Airport.  This pipeline now forms part of UKOP (West London).  In 1963 Esso built their own pipeline from their Fawley refinery to London Heathrow.  The Esso Main and Midlines constructed in the 1970s and 1980s respectively.  The Esso pipeline from Fawley to London is due to be replaced, with the preferred routes G and J – North and South of Alton Pumping station being announced in June 2018. For a further description see CLH Pipeline System.

UKOP 
The United Kingdom Oil Pipeline (UKOP) is an oil products pipeline opened in 1969 and connecting the two (then) Shell refineries of Stanlow (Cheshire) and Shell Haven (Thames Estuary). UKOP is owned by a consortium of five shareholders Essar Midlands Ltd, BP, Shell, Valero and Total. UKOP is administered and operated by the British Pipeline Agency (BPA), which is jointly owned by Shell and BP. As part of the UKOP network, in 1982 BPA began work a pipeline from Walton to Gatwick and this was substantively complete by the end of the year.  However, in 1983 the pipeline had to be shut down and was not brought back into operation until 1984.  In 1985 the UKOP pipeline from Kingsbury to Buncefield was commissioned.

UKOP transports 7.5 million tonnes of mixed products each year distributed to major oil terminals at Buncefield and Kingsbury with spurs to Northampton and Nottingham.
UKOP now draws its products from Essar Stanlow in the north, with smaller volumes from tankage at Shell Haven.  UKOP carries two grades of petrol, two grades of kerosene (including Jet A-1) and two grades of gas oil-diesel.

To ensure safety and integrity, the pipeline is patrolled by helicopter every two weeks.

Petroleum product pipelines 
A list of UK petroleum pipelines. Pipelines are multi-product lines with batches of product separated by pigs, except for single product lines where shown, for example aviation kerosene.

Crude oil pipelines 
In addition to the petroleum products pipelines there are a number of crude oil pipelines transporting crude oil from offshore installations to coastal terminals and from terminals to refineries. The sources give various and conflicting lengths and capacities.

See also 
For details of UK gas pipelines see National Transmission System
 CLH Pipeline System
 Oil terminals in the United Kingdom
 British Pipeline Agency

References

Further reading 
 Tim Whittle: Fuelling the Wars – PLUTO and the Secret Pipeline Network 1936 to 2015 published 2017. 

Oil pipelines in the United Kingdom
Refined oil product pipelines
BP subsidiaries
Shell plc subsidiaries
Joint ventures